RagingBull.com is a website focused on financial literacy and day trading.

History
RagingBull.com was founded in August 1997 by Bill Martin with college partners, Rusty Szurek and Greg Wright, who were 19 years old at the time. It was begun in a basement with an initial investment of $30,000 from savings and credit card loans.

By mid-1998, the website had 8,000 registered users.

David Wetherell, CEO of CMGI, discovered the website while on vacation. In October 1998, CMGI invested $2 million in Raging Bull for a 40% stake. At that time, the co-founders were each 21 years old.

In February 2000, AltaVista, which was majority owned by CMGI, acquired the website in a stock transaction. At that time, Raging Bull had 425,000 registered members, 12 million daily page views, and message boards where users posted 35,000 messages per day.

In January 2001, Terra acquired the website.

In February 2006, Terra's Lycos division sold Quote.com and RagingBull.com to Interactive Data Corporation for $30 million. RagingBull was integrated into eSignal.

In June 2017, Chuck Jaffe was named chief editor of the website. After a short, 6-month "experiment" with Jaffe as editor, the site changed direction and Jaffe was released from his position as Chief Editor of RagingBull.com.

FTC Suit and Settlement
In December 2020, the Federal Trade Commission said the company operators have defrauded consumers out of more than $137 million over the past three years. FTC attorneys are seeking federal court orders freezing company assets, halting the alleged fraud scheme and awarding relief to consumers, including refunds and restitution.

In March 2022, a settlement was reached where RagingBull.com as well Sherwood Ventures LLC and defendants Jason Bond and Jeff Bishop paid $2.425 Million to address what the FTC called "bogus stock earnings claims" and a hard to cancel subscription service.

References

Financial services companies established in 1997
Internet properties established in 1997
English-language websites